Marriott Vacations Worldwide Corporation is a pure-play public timeshare company. Formerly a division of Marriott International, Marriott Vacations Worldwide was established as a separate, publicly traded entity focusing primarily on vacation ownership in November 2011. Marriott Vacations Worldwide runs more than 70 resorts with over 400,000 Owners and Members. Its brands include Marriott Vacation Club, Marriott Vacation Club Pulse, Grand Residences by Marriott, and The Ritz-Carlton Destination Club.

History 
Marriott Ownership Resorts Inc. (MORI) was established on April 17, 1984 with the acquisition of American Resorts on Hilton Head Island, South Carolina. Marriott’s Monarch became the first MORI resort. In 1995, MORI became Marriott Vacation Club International. The move reflected the company’s evolution from real estate development and sales focus to "delivering an overall vacation experience". In 1997, the company expanded to Europe with its first resort in Marbella, Spain. In 2001, the first Asian resort in Phuket, Thailand was added to the company's collection. Similar to its successful segmentation of the lodging industry pioneered in the 1980s, Marriott Vacation Club International introduced The Ritz-Carlton Destination Club in 1999 – a luxury fractional ownership offering. Two years later, the Grand Residences by Marriott brand was created. The first property opened in 2002 in South Lake Tahoe, California. In 2007, Marriott Vacation Club International began to market its core timeshare brand as Marriott Vacation Club. In 2010, the company launched its points-based Marriott Vacation Club Destinations Program in North America and the Caribbean. This change was the most significant program innovation in the company’s history and provided a new product offering increased flexibility.

ILG, Inc. acquisition 
In April 2018, Marriott Vacations Worldwide announced that they would purchase ILG, Inc. for $4.7 billion.

References

External links 
Official website
Club Marriott

Companies listed on the New York Stock Exchange
Timeshare chains